Anthony Barylla (born 1 June 1997) is a German professional footballer who plays as a right-back for  club Erzgebirge Aue.

Career

RB Leipzig
Barylla is a product of the RB Leipzig youth academy.

FSV Zwickau
In July 2017, Barylla moved to FSV Zwickau. He made his competitive debut for the club on 23 July 2017 in a 1–0 away defeat to Chemnitzer FC. He was subbed on for Morris Schröter in the 84th minute. He scored his first competitive goal for the club on 31 March 2018 in a 2–1 away defeat to Carl Zeiss Jena. His goal, assisted by Fabian Schnabel, came in the 81st minute.

1. FC Saarbrücken
1. FC Saarbrücken announced on 2 June 2019, that they had signed Barylla.

Personal life
Anthony's father, André, was a professional footballer who played for Zwickau. Barylla's uncle, Dirk Pfitzner, was also a professional footballer, who played for FC Sachsen Leipzig, FC Rot-Weiß Erfurt, and FC Carl Zeiss Jena. He now owns a fashion business in Erfurt.

References

External links
 
 

1997 births
Living people
Sportspeople from Gera
German footballers
Footballers from Thuringia
Association football defenders
3. Liga players
Regionalliga players
RB Leipzig II players
FSV Zwickau players
1. FC Saarbrücken players
FC Erzgebirge Aue players